Deed from the Five Nations to the King, of their Beaver Hunting Ground, more commonly known as the Nanfan Treaty, was an agreement made between the representatives of the Iroquois Confederacy with John Nanfan, the acting colonial governor of New York, on behalf of The Crown. The treaty was conducted in Albany, New York, on July 19, 1701, and amended by both parties on September 14, 1726.

The Five Nations (which became the 'Six Nations' after 1720) granted "after mature deliberation out of a deep sense of the many Royal favours extended to us by the present great Monarch of England King William the Third" the title to a vast area of land, covering significant portions of the present-day Midwestern United States and southern Ontario that they had claimed as a hunting ground, as far west as 'Quadoge' (now Chicago), by right of conquest during the later Beaver Wars of the 17th century.

As the vast majority of the Beaver Hunting Grounds described in the Nanfan Treaty were also claimed by New France or its Algonquian Indian allies, the French did not recognize the treaty (it did recognize Iroquois suzerainty to the British crown in the 1713 Treaty of Utrecht) and the English made no real attempt to settle these parts for the time being. In the amended agreement 25 years later, the strip of land 60 miles wide adjoining Lakes Erie and Ontario, starting at Sandusky Creek, was reserved for continued Six Nations occupation and use, with the permission of its owner under the 1701 agreement, the King of Great Britain.

A copy of the treaty, containing the totem images of more than a dozen Iroquois chiefs, is part of the collections of the British National Archives.

See also
 Ohio Country
 Beaver Wars

References

Other sources
"Deed from the Five Nations to the King, of their Beaver Hunting Ground," in A Century of Lawmaking for a New Nation: U.S. Congressional Documents and Debates, 1774–1875
 - a copy of the Nanfan Treaty

Iroquois
Treaties of indigenous peoples of North America
Treaties of the Kingdom of Great Britain
1701 treaties
1701 in New France
1701 in the Thirteen Colonies
Native American history of Illinois
Native American history of Indiana
Native American history of Michigan
Native American history of New York (state)
Native American history of Ohio
Native American history of Pennsylvania
First Nations history in Ontario
First Nations history in Quebec
Louisiana (New France)
Northwest Territory
History of the Midwestern United States
Collection of The National Archives (United Kingdom)